John Frederick "Chow" Hayes (7 September 19117 May 1993) was an Australian criminal who became known as Australia's first gangster.

Early life
Hayes was born in the Sydney suburb of Paddington, New South Wales on 7 September 1911, the illegitimate son of Elizabeth Hayes who was a prostitute and petty criminal (although Hayes lied about much of his early background in his biography).  He was soon put into the care of his grandmother and an aunt, and was brought up by them. He lived his early years in the inner-city suburbs of Chippendale and Haymarket. 

Hayes rarely attended school after his eighth birthday, and earned a living as a newspaper seller in the area around Central railway station known as Railway Square. He was caught for truancy on a number of occasions and was sent to boy reformatories. As a teenager he became involved with gang-related crime in and around his local area, namely shoplifting, petty theft and assault. Hayes was known as a major player in the Sydney Gang Wars of the late 1920s and 1930s and was known to police as an extremely violent person. In February 1939 Chow Hayes was shot at Glebe and taken to Royal Prince Alfred Hospital. In a show of bravado, he discharged himself with the bullet still inside his body to avoid police interrogation. 

Incidents like this were reported widely in the national media, and Chow Hayes's hard reputation grew.

Adult life
Hayes' criminal career progressed as he grew older. A biography that was written about him in 1990 by David Hickie named "Chow Hayes, Gunman", suggested that he started carrying and using firearms in his late teens. He became involved in larger robberies and stand-over extortion scams, which enriched his ego, but also gave him a very bad reputation with the general public and thus became a menace to the police. 

In 1929, Chow was aligned with Kate Leigh against Tilly Devine in the Razor Wars where he took part in a Razor fight at Kings Cross, New South Wales which involved approximately 50 of Australia's Sydney Gangsters.

Chow Hayes spent many years of his life in prison for a succession of crimes which included small felonies such as drunkenness to capital crimes such as murder. In 1938 he shot Henry Jack Baker, the de facto partner of Sydney crime czar Kate Leigh outside Leigh's home at Lansdowne Street Surry Hills, but he escaped prosecution. 

During the mid 1940s, Chow Hayes committed many crimes with his friend William 'Joey' Hollebone.

On New Year's Day 1945 he shot and killed a fellow Sydney gangster named Eddie Weyman (1915-1945) , but he was later found not guilty at trial although in the David Hickie biography, Hayes admitted that he had indeed killed Weyman and got away with it. In 1951 he murdered a fellow gangster William 'Bobby' Lee (1915-1951) at a Sydney inner city nightclub in retribution after Lee had shot and killed Hayes's nephew Dennis James (Danny) Simmons in a case of mistaken identity.  After hiding from police for six weeks, he (and his accomplice William 'Joey' Hollebone) was finally caught by the notorious Sydney detective Ray 'Gunner' Kelly. He was tried twice for this offence before he was finally found guilty at his third trial in 1952. Hayes served over fifteen years in prison for the murder of Lee.

He was freed from prison under licence in the mid-1960s, and was soon back extorting money from many of Sydney's most dangerous criminals, including crooked casino boss Dick Reilly and the 'king' of Sydney's brothel business Joe Borg. Hayes was initially implicated in Borg's murder in May 1968, although the police quickly determined that he was not involved. 

Hayes was back in jail for another seven years in 1970 for a grievous bodily harm conviction when he sliced the face and arms of Gerald John Hutchinson with a broken glass in 1969.

Family life
Chow Hayes was married on 23 December 1932 to his childhood sweetheart, Gladys Muriel King (1913-1969), known as 'Topsy', and they had four children, three sons and a daughter.

Last years and death
After spending over 30 years in prison at different times, Chow Hayes was released on 14 February 1977. All of his ill-gotten wealth was long gone, either wasted on gambling or on expensive legal costs. He lived out the rest of his life with no criminal convictions, and lived in a flat at Lidcombe. 

After a long battle with cancer, Hayes died in Sydney on 7 May 1993. His cremated ashes were placed in his wife's grave on 31 January 1994 at Rookwood Cemetery. He was survived by his daughter.

References

Further reading
 David Hickie, Chow Hayes, Gunman  published by Angus and Robertson Books, Australia, 1990
 N. Lipson & T. Barnao, As Crime Goes By. The Life and Times Of Bill Jenkings. Published by Ironbark Press, 1992, Australia

1911 births
1993 deaths
Australian organised crime figures
Criminals from New South Wales
Deaths from cancer in Australia
Australian people convicted of murder
20th-century Australian criminals
Organised crime in Sydney